= D. W. Griffith bibliography =

A list of books and essays about D. W. Griffith:

- D.W. Griffith's the Birth of a Nation : A History of the Most Controversial Motion Picture of All Time: A History of the Most Controversial Motion Picture of All Time. Oxford University Press. December 14, 2007. ISBN 978-0-19-804436-9.
- Gunning, Tom (1994). D.W. Griffith and the Origins of American Narrative Film: The Early Years at Biograph. University of Illinois Press. ISBN 978-0-252-06366-4.
- Schickel, Richard (January 1, 1996). D.W. Griffith: An American Life. Hal Leonard Corporation. ISBN 978-0-87910-080-3.
- Simmon, Scott (July 30, 1993). The Films of D. W. Griffith. CUP Archive. ISBN 978-0-521-38820-7.
- Slide, Anthony (2012). D. W. Griffith: Interviews. Univ. Press of Mississippi. ISBN 978-1-61703-298-1.
